Charles Sydney "Bubba" Carpenter (born July 23, 1968) is a former Major League Baseball player. He was an outfielder and designated hitter for the Colorado Rockies in the 2000 season. He attended college at the University of Arkansas and is 6 foot 1 and 185 pounds. Bubba was signed as an Amateur Free Agent by the New York Yankees in 1991. He made his Major League debut on May 13, 2000 and played his final game on June 6, 2000. In 15 career games, he was 6 for 27, a .222 average. 3 of his 6 career hits were home runs. In his career, he was also a member of the New York Yankees organization.

External links

Career statistics and player information from Korea Baseball Organization

Colorado Rockies players
1968 births
Living people
American expatriate baseball players in South Korea
KBO League outfielders
Hyundai Unicorns players
Gary SouthShore RailCats players
Major League Baseball outfielders
Baseball players from Dallas
Lincoln Saltdogs players
Acereros de Monclova players
Albany-Colonie Yankees players
American expatriate baseball players in Mexico
Carolina Mudcats players
Colorado Springs Sky Sox players
Columbus Clippers players
Gulf Coast Yankees players
Norfolk Tides players
Prince William Cannons players
Saraperos de Saltillo players